The 2010 Coca-Cola GM was the 40th edition of the Greenlandic Men's Football Championship. The final round was held in Nuuk from August 16 to 21. It was won by B-67 Nuuk for the seventh time in its history.

Qualifying stage

North Greenland

Disko Bay

NB Some match results are unavailable.

Central Greenland

NB Nuuk IL qualified for the final Round as hosts.

South Greenland

NB Some match results are unavailable.

Final round

Pool 1

Pool 2

Playoffs

Semi-finals

Seventh-place match

Fifth-place match

Third-place match

Final

See also
Football in Greenland
Football Association of Greenland
Greenland national football team
Greenlandic Men's Football Championship

References

Greenlandic Men's Football Championship seasons
Green
Green
Foot